Semarang (Pegon: سماراڠ) is the capital and largest city of Central Java province in Indonesia. It was a major port during the Dutch colonial era, and is still an important regional center and port today. The city has been named as the cleanest tourist destination in Southeast Asia by the ASEAN Clean Tourist City Standard (ACTCS) for 2020–2022.

The population of the city was 1,555,984 at the 2010 census and 1,653,524 at the 2020 census, making it Indonesia's ninth most populous city after Jakarta, Surabaya, Bekasi, Bandung, Medan, Depok, Tangerang and Palembang. The built-up urban area had 3,183,516 inhabitants at the 2010 census spread over two cities and 26 districts. The Semarang metropolitan area (a.k.a. Kedungsepur) has a population of over 6 million in 2020 (see Greater Semarang section). The population of the city is predominantly Javanese with significant Chinese presence.

History 

The history of Semarang goes back to the 9th century, when it was known as Bergota. At the end of the 15th century, an Arab named Kyai Pandan Arang founded a village and an Islamic school in this fishing village. On 2 May 1547, Sultan Hadiwijaya of Pajang Kyai declared Pandan Arang the first bupati (mayor) of Semarang, thus creating Semarang administratively and politically.

In 1678, Sunan Amangkurat II promised to give control of Semarang to the Dutch East India Company (VOC) as a part of a debt payment. In 1682, the Semarang state was founded by the Dutch colonial power. On 5 October 1705 after years of occupations, Semarang officially became a VOC city when Susuhunan Pakubuwono I made a deal to give extensive trade rights to the VOC in exchange of wiping out Mataram's debt. The VOC, and later, the Dutch East Indies government, established tobacco plantations in the region and built roads and railroads, making Semarang an important colonial trading centre. 

The historic presence of a large Indo (Eurasian) community in the area of Semarang is also reflected by the fact a creole mix language called Javindo existed there.

Classical Indische Town (1678–1870) 

Semarang was handed by the Sultan of Mataram to the Dutch East Indies in 1678. The city was pictured as a small settlement with a pious Muslim area called Kauman, a Chinese quarter, and a Dutch fortress. The fortress has a pentagonal form with only one gate in the south and five monitoring towers to protect the Dutch settlement from rebellion actions, segregating the spaces between Dutch settlement and other areas. In fact, the city of Semarang was only referred to the Dutch quarter while the other ethnic settlement were considered as villages outside the city boundary. The city, known as de Europeesche Buurt, was built in classical European style with church located in the centre, wide boulevards, streets and villas.  According to Purwanto (2005), the urban and architectural form of this settlement is very similar to the design principles applied in many Dutch cities, which begun to concern on the urban beautification.

Due to the long and costly Java War, there was not much funding from the Dutch East Indies government, which affected Semarang's development. The majority of land was used for rice fields and the only small improvement was the development of a surrounding fortress. Although less developed, Semarang has a fairly arranged city system, in which urban activities were concentrated along the river and the settlement was linked to a market where different ethnic groups met to trade. The existence of the market, in the later years, become a primary element and a generator of urban economic growth.

After the departure of Herman Willem Daendels, Napoleonic governor of Java, the Dutch reorganized Java into Residencies, and Semarang became the seat of the new Semarang Residency in 1817. An important influence on urban growth was the Great Mail Road project in the 1847, which connected all the cities in the northern coast of Central and East Java and positioned Semarang as the trade centre of agricultural production. The project was soon followed by the development of the Staatsspoorwegen Railway and the connecting roads into the inner city of Semarang at the end of the 19th century. Colombijn (2002) marked the development as the shift of urban functions, from the former river orientation to all services facing the roads.

Modern city (1870–1922) 

The Dutch East Indies' mail and railway projects improved communication and transportation, bringing an economic boom to the city in the 1870s. Hospitals, churches, hotels, and mansions were built along the new main roads of Mataram Street, Bojongscheweg, and Pontjolscheweg. The Javanese quarters of town known as kampongs grew increasingly densely populated, reaching as many as 1000 inhabitants per hectare and degrading living conditions. Mortality remained high into the early 20th century, with newcomers, overcrowding, and poor hygiene triggering cholera and tuberculous outbreaks. Dysentery, typhoid, and malaria were also rife. The city doctor Willem T. de Vogel advocated strenuously for reducing overcrowding and improving living conditions by extending Semarang into the less malarial hill country to its south; his fellow councilman Hendrik Tillema had campaigned on a platform of combatting malaria and joined De Vogel's scheme, broadening it into a "village improvement" movement. Purchasing land in the heights with their own money, the two men and some friends passed it on to the city with an initial zoning plan by KPC de Bazel in 1907 but could never convince a majority of the council to support its development. Changing tack, Tillema then worked to improve the existing kampongs in the city's malarial districts by improving drainage and providing more sanitary public toilets and public housing.

A decade later, the town approved Thomas Karsten's revised plan for the area, using it to build larger villas for the Dutch and wealthy Chinese and Javanese rather than allowing its use by the poor. This area became known as Candi Baru and forms the core of the present-day Candisari District. Although it remained highly stratified by class, Candi Baru had less ethnic segregation than the older area of town and incorporated public squares, athletic facilities, and places for public bathing and washing that could be used communally. With most work remaining in the lower city and transportation slow or expensive, few of the lower classes were interested in moving to the district but it set a pattern that was followed with three more successful housing plans between 1916 and 1919. The population grew by 55%, adding 45,000 Javanese, 8500 Chinese, and 7000 Europeans. Karsten's approach to town planning emphasized its aesthetic, practical, and social requirements articulated in economic terms rather than purely racial ones.

Driven by economic growth and spatial city planning, the city had doubled in size and expanded to the south by the 1920s, creating a nucleus of a metropolis where multi-ethnic groups lived and traded in the city. The villages in the suburbs such as Jomblang and Jatingaleh steadily became the satellite towns of Semarang, more populated with a bigger market area. Before the invasion of Japan in 1942, Semarang had already become the capital of Central Java province, as the result of trade and industrial success and spatial planning.

Japanese occupation and early independence 
The Japanese military occupied the city, along with the rest of Java, in 1942, during the Pacific War of World War II. During that time, Semarang was headed by a military governor called a Shiko, and two vice governors known as Fuku Shiko. One of the vice governors was appointed from Japan, and the other was "chosen" from the local population. 

After Indonesian independence in 1945, Semarang became the capital of Central Java on 18 August 1945, headed by Mr. Moch.Ichsan. It also became the site of a battle between Indonesian and Japanese soldiers in October 1945.

Administration 
Semarang city administration is headed by mayor, with a legislative assembly. Both mayor and members of legislative assembly are elected by direct vote. The government of Semarang City had implemented the smart city concept since 2013.

Juridically, Semarang City is a municipality (second level area) consisting of 16 districts (kecamatan), which again divided into 177 urban villages (kelurahan). The districts are tabulate below with their areas, their populations at the 2020 census and 2020 census, and the number and names of the urban villages in each district. The city of Semarang is divided into five urban areas, including: Central Semarang, East Semarang, West Semarang, South Semarang, and North Semarang.

Geography 
Semarang is located on the northern coast of Java. The city of Semarang is one of the important cities located on the north coast of Java and as the main hub connecting Jakarta and Surabaya, and cities in the southern interior of Java Surakarta and Yogyakarta. Semarang City is a city that has a unique topographic condition in the form of a narrow lowland area and hilly areas extending from the west side to the east side of Semarang City.

Lowland areas in Semarang City are very narrow. This lowland area is a flood plain from the large rivers that flow in Semarang City, such as Kali Garang (West Flood Canal), Pengkol River, and Bringin River. This low-lying area stretches on the northern side of Semarang and covers almost 40% of the total area of Semarang. This lowland area is known as the lower town (Semarang Ngisor), as well as the center of the city's economic activity. Under these conditions, the lower city area is often hit by annual flooding and its peak during the rainy season. In a number of regions, especially North Semarang, floods are sometimes also caused by overflowing sea tides (tidal floods). The hilly area in Semarang stretches on the south side. These hills are part of a series of northern Java mountain ranges that stretch from Banten to East Java. The hilly area in the city of Semarang is known as the upper city (Semarang Dhuwur). This hilly region is also the upstream area of the big rivers that flow in the city of Semarang. The upper city area is also near Mount Ungaran.

Climate 
Semarang features a tropical rainforest climate that borders on a tropical monsoon climate (Am). The city features distinctly wetter and drier months, with June through August being the driest months. However, the average monthly rainfall does not fall below , hence the tropical rainforest categorization. Diurnal temperature variation slightly increases in the dry season.

Semarang River and flood control 
Like Singapore River, Semarang is constructing Semarang River at Banjir Kanal Barat (Garang River) near Karangayu Bridge. In the middle of July 2011, gardens in river banks and some traditional boats are available to use. The project will be finished in 2013 with river gardens, trotoars, garden lighting, water activities, art sites, sport sites and balconies and stairs for sightseeing.
In August 2011, a  tunnel dodger at Kreo river has been finished and Jatibarang Dam construction can begin, with completion targeted for July 2013. The dam is planned to release  of flood water and will generate 1.5 MW of electricity, provide a drinking water resource and a boost to tourism.

Demographics 
The largest ethnicity of Semarang includes the Javanese, followed by minorities of Chinese, Indian, Arabic, and others (including local ethnicities such as Sundanese, Batak, Madura, etc.). The dominant religion is Islam.

Semarang has a large Chinese community. As in other regions of Java, especially in Central Java, they have mingled closely with the local population and use Javanese in communication for hundreds of years. About 4–5% of the city's population is ethnic Chinese, many residing in a Chinatown in the vicinity of Gang Pinggir. The Chinatown is called "Kampong Pecinan Semawis" and expresses many aspects of traditional Chinese culture including foods, rituals, and houses of worship.

Economy 
As the capital city of Central Java, and fifth largest city of Indonesia, the economy of Semarang is quite large. Semarang has transformed and changed dynamically towards a better direction. In a period of less than 10 years, Semarang Metropolitan continues to build a vital financial contribution to Indonesia due to the growing trade and industry and services. As a consequence, people's purchasing power increased, capital inflows, consumer confidence, and doing business indexes were relatively conducive to the development of several CBDs such as Simpang Lima City Center (SLCC), Pemuda Central Business District (PCBD), and Gajahmada Golden Triangle (GGT). Major Indonesian and international financial and banking sectors alikes such as Bank Mandiri, BCA, BNI, BRI,  Panin Bank, HSBC, Bank Permata, Standard Chartered, RaboBank, Citibank, DBS, UOB, OCBC NISP, KEB Hana Bank, CIMB Niaga, and Maybank have regional offices in Semarang.

The western part of the city has many industrial parks and factories. Like other metropolitan cities within Indonesia, due to a developing economy and increasing income, Semarang has many shopping malls, like Ciputra Mall, Simpang Lima Plasa, Paragon City, Java Supermall, DP Mall, Pollux Central City. Some of the malls are under construction, such as Queen City Mall (a.k.a. Sri Ratu Pemuda), Tentrem Simpang Lima, Uptown Mall at BSB and the Park Semarang. The supermarket and department store chains Hypermart, Giant, and Carrefour Transmart also have a presence beneath the city. Carrefour Transmart has 4 places in Semarang: Transmart Setiabudi at South Semarang, Transmart Majapahit at East Semarang, Carrefour at DP Mall in Central Semarang, and Carrefour at SMC Tlogorejo Hospital in Simpang Lima. Uniqlo, an infamous brand from Japan and H&M, respectively, opened their presence within the city in 2019 and 2020 in DP Mall, one of Sinarmas properties spots in Pemuda.

Transportation

Road 
Semarang is on the Indonesian National Route 1 road, which connects it to Merak and Ketapang (Banyuwangi). Indonesian National Route 14 toward Bawen starts here. Semarang has a toll road, the Semarang Toll Road. The city is connected to Solo by Semarang–Solo Toll Road.

Semarang's largest bus terminals are Mangkang and Terboyo. The primary means of public transportation is by minibus, called "bis". Ojek (motorcycle taxis), Angkot (share-taxi) micro-buses, taxi-cabs plays vital role in public transportation of the city. Go-Jek and Grab have online taxi and Ojek services.

Semarang is served by bus rapid transit called Trans Semarang, which operates in six routes. Perum DAMRI also serves in six designated routes in the city.

Rail 

Semarang was connected to Surakarta (Solo) by a rail line in 1870. At present there are two large train stations in Semarang: Semarang Poncol and Semarang Tawang. Semarang is connected to Bandung, Jakarta, and Surabaya by inter-city train services. Kedungsepur commuter rail connects Semarang Poncol Station eastward to Ngrombo Station in Grobogan Regency.

Air 

Semarang's Ahmad Yani International Airport is served by a number of operators including AirAsia, Citilink, Batik Air, Garuda Indonesia, and Lion Air which provide services to Jakarta, Bali, Kuala Lumpur, and Singapore. In 2018, the airport terminal was relocated to a new and much larger site; the old terminal continues to be used for government and military flights.

Sea 

The main seaport is the Tanjung Mas seaport.

Landmarks and places of interest 

Semarang old town (Kota Lama), which is sometimes referred to by locals as "Little Netherlands." It was established in the 18th century when Indonesia was a Dutch colony. There are more than 50 well-maintained colonial buildings in Kota Lama, displaying 18th, 19th, and 20th century European-influenced architecture.
China Town: Chinatown in Semarang has a night market known as 'Pasar Semawis', which is known for its cuisine and Chinese new year celebration.
Tugu Muda (Youth Monument) is a monument built to commemorate the services of the heroes who have fallen in the Battle of Five Days in Semarang. The height of Tugu Muda is 53 meters. Tugu Muda is located in front of Lawang Sewu at Pemuda street. It depicts the Tugu Muda fighting spirit and patriotism of Semarang residents, especially the youth who are persistent, self-sacrificing in high spirits maintaining the independence of Indonesia.
Lawang Sewu (Javanese for "A Thousand Doors") was built as the headquarters of the Dutch East Indies Railway Company. The colonial era building is reputedly a haunted house.
Blenduk Church (Nederlandsch Indische Kerk) was built in 1753, the church is one of the oldest building in Kota Lama.
The Sam Poo Kong temple is the oldest Chinese temple in the city. Tay Kak Sie Temple was established in 1746, it is dedicated to Guanyin Bodhisattva and various Taoist Deities.
Central Java Grand Mosque: This mosque has a Muslim museum, located at Jl. Gajah Raya. The architecture of the mosque is inspired by the mosques in Mecca and Medina.
Vihara Buddhagaya Watugong: The  Buddhist temple has been named by MURI as the highest pagoda in Indonesia. It's located at Jl. Perintis Kemerdekaan Watugong, about 45 minutes drive from the center.
 Pancasila Square: Located within the heart of Simpang Lima City Center (SLCC) CBD; is an infamous public arena at the town center. It has tourist pedicabs, cars, bicycles, chairs, pedestrian track, public toilet, roller skates, traditional games, grass field and others.

Culture

Education 

There are 593 elementary schools, 220 junior high schools, 106 senior high schools, and 88 vocational high schools, both public and private in Semarang.

There are 20 universities in Semarang, 12 of them private and 8 public. The most renowned universities of Semarang are Diponegoro University and Soegijapranata University.

Diponegoro University (UNDIP): It is one of national or state-owned universities in Semarang, founded in 1957. The university has 11 faculties and 2 schools: Faculty of Economics and Business, Faculty of Social and Political Sciences, Faculty of Humanities, Faculty of Law, Faculty of Medicine, Faculty of Engineering, Faculty of Fishery and Marine Sciences, Faculty of Natural Sciences and Mathematics, Faculty of Public Health, Faculty of Animal Agriculture, Faculty of Psychology, Vocational School, and Postgraduate School. The university also offers a postgraduate program. Diponegoro University is one of the best university in Indonesia.
Semarang State University in Indonesian Universitas Negeri Semarang (UNNES): It is one of national or state-owned universities in Semarang, founded in 1965. The university has 8 faculties and Postgraduate School: Faculty of Science Education, Faculty of Engineering, Faculty of Language and Art, Faculty of Sport Science, Faculty of Social Science, Faculty of Economics, Faculty of Law, and Faculty of mathematics and science. Semarang State University is one of the best university in Indonesia.
Soegijapranata Catholic University (UNIKA): It is one of the private universities in Semarang, founded in 1982. There are 8 faculties in UNIKA: Faculty of Architecture and Design, Faculty of Law and Communication, Faculty of Engineering, Faculty of Language and Arts, Faculty of Economics and Business, Faculty of Agricultural and Technology, Faculty of Psychology, and Faculty of Computer Science.
Muhammadiyah University of Semarang (UNIMUS): It is one of the private universities in Semarang, founded in 1996. On 4 August 1999 the Minister of Education and Culture of the Republic of Indonesia issued an Operational Permit for the University of Muhammadiyah Semarang with number: 139/D/O/1999. 14 study programs that obtained operational permits at the beginning of the opening in 1999 including: Public Health Study Program (Bachelor's degree), Statistics Study Program (Bachelor's degree), Mechanical Engineering Study Program (Bachelor and Diploma degree), Electrical Engineering Study Program (Bachelor and Diploma degree), Food Technology Study Program (Bachelor's degree), Agricultural Technology Study Program (Bachelor's degree), Management Study Program (Bachelor's degree), Company Administration Study Program (Diploma degree), Accounting Study Program (Diploma degree), English Language Study Program (Bachelor's degree), English Language Study Program (Diploma degree) and Japanese Language Study Program (Diploma degree).

Sports 
There are several sport centres in Semarang. Jatidiri sport centre or Jatidiri Stadium is one of the biggest sport centres in Semarang, located in Karangrejo, Gajahmungkur. The centre comprises a soccer field, in line skate track, tennis filed, climbing wall, swimming pool, and many others. The capacity of the centre is about 21,000 people.

Knight Stadium is a futsal and basketball centre in Semarang, located in Grand Marina complex. There is a café and fitness centre in Knight Stadium.

Cuisine 

Semarang is widely known for its bandeng presto (pressure-cooked milkfish), Lumpia, Wingko, Tahu Gimbal, and Ganjel Rel.  Semarang has also been called 'The city of Jamu' because it is an important centre for the production of jamu which are a range of Indonesian herbal medicines that are popular across Indonesia Semawis Market, also known as Pecinan Semarang (Semarang's Chinatown), hosts a plethora of street food vendors, offering a wide varieties of dishes.

Festivals 
 is an annual festival in Semarang desecrated to welcome the Ramadan month (a fasting month for Moslems). The word "dug" describes the sound of bedug (traditional Indonesian musical instrument). The word "der" describes the sound of fireworks.

The icon of the festival is a special puppet dragon-like animal called Warak Ngendog. The word "warak" stands for "holy" and the word "ngendog" expresses a reward for Muslims. Warak Ngendog's feet are chained, representing people's desire that should be postponed during this holy month. As Dugderan is a festival unique for Semarang, it represents an important attraction for both local people and visitors.

Media 
Suara Merdeka is the major local newspaper in Semarang, as well as Central Java. Other major newspapers include Tribun Jateng and Wawasan.

Awards 
Semarang has got Adipura Award for 6 times in a row since 2012. Adipura Award is given for achievement in cleanliness and greenery at parks, streets, markets, shop buildings, premises, schools, even cleanliness of water ways and rivers. Semarang City received the title of Best Smart Living and Best Smart Economy City in the Indonesia Smart Nation Award 2018.

Greater Semarang 
Greater Semarang was initially defined by the government as Semarang city, Semarang Regency, Salatiga city, Kendal Regency, and Demak Regency.  It was later extended to include the western part (12 districts only) of Grobogan Regency. Despite the definition, it includes a lot of rural areas and the urban cores remain distinct; they have not amalgamated into a continuous urban sprawl as in Greater Jakarta.

Sources: BPS Jateng

Notable people from Semarang 
 Agung Laksono, politician and former Chairman of the House of Representatives.
 Jihane Almira Chedid, beauty  queen.
 Anindya Kusuma Putri, Puteri Indonesia 2015 and Top 15 of Miss Universe 2015.
 Anne Avantie, fashion designer.
 Aries Susanti Rahayu, speed climbing world champion.
 Be Biauw Tjoan, Majoor-titulair der Chinezen, magnate, revenue farmer and bureaucrat
 Conrad Emil Lambert Helfrich, Dutch admiral.
 Daniel Sahuleka, Dutch musician.
 F. H. van Naerssen, Dutch professor of Indonesian and Malay and expert on Javanese epigraphy
 Fuad Hassan, politician, former Minister of Education and Culture.
 Hubertus van Mook, Dutch politician.
 Jaya Suprana, musician, writer, TV talkshow host, founder of MURI
 Liem Bwan Tjie, architect.
 Max van Egmond, bass and baritone singer of Baroque and Renaissance music.
 Oei Hui-lan, First Lady of the Republic of China, international socialite and fashion icon.
 Oei Tiong Ham, Majoor-titulair der Chinezen, Chinese Indonesian tycoon.
 P. F. Dahler, politician, member of Investigating Committee for Preparatory Work for Independence (BPUPK).
 Purnomo Yusgiantoro, politician and current Minister of Defence.
 Raden Saleh, painter.
 Rob Nieuwenhuys, literary historian and author.
 Sri Oetari Ratna Dewi, politician
 Stella Cornelia, singer and actress, ex-member of JKT48
 Sutiyoso, chief of Indonesian Intelligence Bureau (BIN).
 Tukul Arwana, comedian and television personality.
 Willem Einthoven, medical doctor, invented electrocardiography (ECG), Nobel Prize winner.

Sister cities 

Semarang is twinned with:
  Brisbane, Australia
  Da Nang, Vietnam

Notes and references

Notes

References

 Graaf, H. J. de (Hermanus Johannes), 1899-(?), "Chinese Muslims in Java in the 15th and 16th centuries : the Malay Annals of Semarang and Cerbon" / translated and provided with comments by H.J. de Graaf and Th.G.Th. Pigeaud; edited by M.C. Ricklefs. Publisher: [Melbourne] : Monash University, 1984. Description: xiii, 221 p. : folded map ; 21 cm.  : Series: Monash papers on Southeast Asia ; no. 12

External links 

  

 
Populated places in Central Java
Populated coastal places in Indonesia
Port cities and towns in Indonesia
Provincial capitals in Indonesia